National Labor Relations Board v Jones & Laughlin Steel Corporation, 301 U.S. 1 (1937), was a United States Supreme Court case that upheld the constitutionality of the National Labor Relations Act of 1935, also known as the Wagner Act. The case represented a major expansion in the Court's interpretation of Congress's power under the Commerce Clause and effectively spelled the end to the Court's striking down of New Deal economic legislation.

The case arose after the National Labor Relations Board (NLRB) ordered Jones & Laughlin Steel to rehire workers who had been fired for seeking to unionize. Jones and Laughlin refused to comply on the grounds that the Wagner Act, which had established the NLRB, was unconstitutional.

In a 5–4 decision, Chief Justice Charles Evans Hughes upheld the constitutionality of the Wagner Act, holding that Congress could regulate economic activities that were "intrastate in character when separately considered" if they held "such a close and substantial relation to interstate commerce that their control is essential or appropriate to protect that commerce from burdens and obstructions." In his dissent, Associate Justice James Clark McReynolds argued that Congress's power to regulate interstate commerce should be limited to cases in which a violation is "direct and material."

Background
Jones & Laughlin Steel, the fourth largest steel producer in the United States, was charged with discriminating against workers who wanted to join the Steel Workers Organizing Committee (SWOC). The company had fired ten employees at its plant in Aliquippa, Pennsylvania, after they moved to unionize. The NLRB ruled against the company and ordered that the workers be rehired and given back pay, but Jones & Laughlin refused to comply on the grounds and believed the Act to be unconstitutional. Citing Supreme Court precedent, lower courts agreed.

Decision

Chief Justice Charles Evans Hughes wrote the majority opinion in the case, which reversed the lower court's ruling, in a 5–4 decision:

Justice McReynolds dissented, questioning Congress's enhanced power under the commerce clause. Although he did not dispute Congress's regulation of commerce between the states, he stated that Congress's interference should be in cases where a violation is "direct and material." McReynolds stated that taxation on property, for example, may indirectly but seriously affect the cost of transportation. He concluded that Congress had transcended the power granted to it by the Constitution.

See also
United States labor law
List of United States Supreme Court cases, volume 301

Notes

References

External links
 
 
 Case Brief for NLRB v. Jones & Laughlin Steel Corp. at Lawnix.com

United States Constitution Article One case law
United States Supreme Court cases
United States Supreme Court cases of the Hughes Court
1937 in United States case law
United States Commerce Clause case law
United States Seventh Amendment case law
v. Jones and Laughlin Steel Corporation
History of Beaver County, Pennsylvania
United Steelworkers litigation
United States labor case law
Aliquippa, Pennsylvania
Steel industry of the United States
Constitutional challenges to the New Deal